Gretna balenge, commonly known as the giant crepuscular skipper, is a species of butterfly in the family Hesperiidae. It is found in Sierra Leone, Liberia, Ivory Coast, Ghana, Togo, Nigeria, Cameroon, Gabon, the Central African Republic, the Democratic Republic of the Congo, Uganda, Tanzania and Zambia. The habitat consists of all areas where suitable palms grow.

Adults are attracted to various kinds of foul substances.

The larvae feed on Raphia farinifera and Eremospatha species.

Subspecies
Gretna balenge balenge - Nigeria, Cameroon, Gabon, Central African Republic, Democratic Republic of the Congo, western Uganda, north-western Tanzania, northern Zambia
Gretna balenge zowa Lindsey & Miller, 1965 - Sierra Leone, Liberia, Ivory Coast, Ghana, Togo

References

Butterflies described in 1891
Butterflies of Africa
Hesperiinae